Maharashtrachi Hasyajatra is an Indian Marathi-language comedy show which airing on Sony Marathi from 21 August 2018. It is produced by Sachin Goswami and Sachin Mote under the banner of Wet Cloud Production. It is hosted by Prajakta Mali.

Season summary

Concept 
It is a Marathi language stand up comedy reality show where popular Marathi actors and professional comedians perform skits on stage. 
Skits' duration is around 12 to 15 minutes. 
First of all host of show (Prajakta Mali) briefly introduces subject of skit to audience & Judges (Prasad Oak, Sai Tamhankar). Then all comedians perform their act (skit). Judges give them comments as per their performances.
As this show has been extremely popular, many celebrities too use this platform for promoting their films,dramas and webseries & they also take part in skit as guest performer.

Judges

Guest Judge 
 Sunil Barve
 Usha Nadkarni
 Swapnil Joshi
 Bharti Achrekar
 Johnny Lever
 Anu Malik
 Sonalee Kulkarni
 Mahesh Manjrekar
 Shivaji Satam

Cast 
Color key
  Hasya Khurda
  Hasya Budruk

 Priyadarshani Indalkar (2020-2022)
 Nikhil Bane (2018-2022)
 Dattu More (2022)
 Viraj Jagtap (2022)
 Ashish Pawar (2022)
 Rohit Mane (2022)

Guests Comedians 
 Sulekha Talwalkar
 Anupama Takmoghe
 Atul Todankar
 Prajakta Hanamghar
 Anand Ingale
 Surekha Kudachi
 Chinmayee Sumeet
 Suvedha Desai
 Rujuta Deshmukh
 Bhargavi Chirmule
 Bharat Jadhav
 Meghana Erande
 Jyoti Subhash
 Apurva Nemlekar
 Subodh Bhave 
 Prasad Jawade
 Vijay Nikam
 Mahesh Manjrekar
 Lalit Prabhakar
 Rohit Raut
 Subhash Ghai
 Rohit Haldikar
 Sonali Parchure
 Vijay Patkar
 Atul Gogavale
 Bhuvan Bam
 Akshay Tanksale
 Ranveer Singh

References

External links 
 
 Maharashtrachi Hasyajatra at SonyLIV

Sony Marathi original programming
2018 Indian television series debuts
Marathi-language television shows
Indian stand-up comedy television series